Kowal may refer to:
Kowal (surname), a surname
Kowal (town), a town in Poland
Kowal (gmina), a gmina (administrative district) in Poland
99P/Kowal, a periodic comet

See also
 
Koval (disambiguation)
Kowall, a surname